The Toyota NBC platform is an automobile platform for subcompact cars (B-segment cars) from Toyota. "NBC" stands for "New Basic Car" or "New Basic Compact". The NBC platform made its debut in January 1999 with the first generation Vitz; as such, it is also called the "Vitz platform". It is replaced by the newer B platform.

Features 
NBC cars can be either front-wheel-drive or all-wheel-drive.
AWD variants use V-Flex II system, which is a viscous-coupling torque-on-demand.
Engines are mounted transversely.
Front suspension is MacPherson strut, while rear is torsion beam.
Brakes are ventilated discs at front and leading-trailing drums at rear. Rear disc brakes were introduced in August of 1999 as an option but came standard on models such as the European T-Sport and Japanese Vitz RS.

Models 
First-generation Vitz family:
Hatchback: XP10 — Vitz/Yaris/Echo (Japan/Europe/Canada/Australia)
Sedan: XP10 — Platz/Echo (Japan/Canada/United States)
MPV: XP20 — Fun Cargo/Yaris Verso (Japan/Europe)
Various vehicles based on the first-generation Vitz:
AP10 — Porte
XP19 — WiLL Vi
XP30 — First-generation bB (Japan) and Scion xB (United States)
XP40 — First-generation Vios/Soluna Vios
XP50 — Probox/Succeed vans and wagons (use stretched wheelbase)
XP60 — First-generation ist (Japan) and Scion xA (United States)
XP70 — WiLL Cypha
XP80 — First-generation Sienta
XZ20 — Second-generation Raum

Notes 
Second-generation bB and xB are no longer based on NBC platform:
Second-generation bB uses smaller Passo/Daihatsu Boon "NC" platform (which is Daihatsu-rooted);
Second-generation xB utilizes larger MC platform.
The third vehicle in the "WiLL" series — WiLL VS — was built on a larger MC platform.
The full model code is depending on the engine, see List of Toyota model codes for formula.

EFC platform 
Introduced in 2010, the EFC platform is derived from the NBC platform and used primarily for models sold in some emerging countries. The platform had been designed to cut down on non-essential parts and made it as low-cost as possible. "EFC" stands for "Emerging markets Frontier Concept" or "Entry Family Car". This platform was later replaced by Daihatsu-developed DNGA-B platform starting 2022.

Models 
AK10 — Etios
XP150 — Third-generation Vios/Yaris

References 

NBC